Arthur Hardy may refer to:
Arthur Hardy (businessman) (1817–1909), British-born Australian pastoralist, barrister, quarry-owner, businessman and politician  
Arthur Sturgis Hardy (1837–1901), Canadian premier of Ontario, 1896–1899
Arthur Sherburne Hardy (1847–1930), U.S. diplomat and academic
Arthur Hardy (actor) (1870–1951), British actor
Arthur Charles Hardy (1872–1962), Canadian politician
Arthur Hardy (footballer) (fl. 1891–1893), English footballer
Arthur Hardy (baseball) (1891–1980), American baseball player
Arthur C. Hardy (1895–1977), president of the Optical Society of America, 1935–1936
Arthur "Smokestack" Hardy (1901–1995), American volunteer fire fighter, photographer, black fire historian and collector of fire memorabilia

See also